Saraguro (also Sarakuru) is a canton of Ecuador, located in Loja Province. Its capital is the town of Saraguro. The capital of the canton is the parish and town of Saraguro.

Demographics
The population of Saraguro Canton in the 2001 census was 28,029. In 2010 the population had increased to 30,183.  A sizable percentage of the population is made up of the Saraguro people, an indigenous ethnic group whose members have retained much of their land and customs.

Parishes 
Saraguro canton is divided into ll parishes.

 Saraguro (capital) 
 El Paraíso de Celen
 El Tablón  
 Lluzhapa
 Manu
 San Antonio de Cumbe
 San Pablo de Tenta
 San Sebastián de Yuluc
 Selva Alegre
 Urdaneta (Paquishapa)
 Sumaypamba

References

Cantons of Loja Province